Maundy may refer to:

Maundy Thursday, a Christian holiday commemorating the Last Supper
Maundy (foot washing), the liturgical foot washing ceremonies which occurs on Maundy Thursday
Maundy money, dispensed at the Maundy ceremony by the British Monarch

See also
Maundy Gregory